Vladimír Škoda (born October 9, 1983) is a Czech professional ice hockey player who is currently playing for HKm Zvolen in the Slovak Extraliga.

External links

1983 births
HKM Zvolen players
Living people
Czech ice hockey centres
Sportspeople from České Budějovice
Czech expatriate ice hockey players in Slovakia
Czech expatriate ice hockey players in Canada
Czech expatriate ice hockey players in Germany
Czech expatriate sportspeople in Kazakhstan
Expatriate ice hockey players in Kazakhstan